Veremeenko or Verameyenka is a gender-neutral Slavic surname that may refer to
Anastasiya Verameyenka (born 1987), Belarusian basketball player
Sergey Veremeenko (born 1955), Russian businessman
Vladimir Veremeenko (born 1984), Belarusian basketball player, brother of Anastasiya